The 1986 NCAA Women's Golf Championships were contested at the fifth annual NCAA-sanctioned golf tournament to determine the individual and team national champions of women's collegiate golf in the United States. Until 1996, the NCAA would hold just one annual women's golf championship for all programs across Division I, Division II, and Division III.

The tournament was held at the Ohio State University Golf Club in Columbus, Ohio.

Defending champions Florida won the team championship, the Gators' second.

Page Dunlap, from Florida, won the individual title.

Individual results

Individual champion
 Page Dunlap, Florida (291, −1)

Team results

 DC = Defending champion
 Debut appearance

References

NCAA Women's Golf Championship
Golf in Ohio
NCAA Women's Golf Championship
NCAA Women's Golf Championship
NCAA Women's Golf Championship